"Consumed" is the sixth episode of the fifth season of the post-apocalyptic horror television series The Walking Dead which aired on AMC on November 16, 2014. The episode was written by Matthew Negrete and Corey Reed, and directed by Seith Mann. The episode primarily focuses on Carol Peletier (Melissa McBride) as she accompanies Daryl Dixon (Norman Reedus) in searching for Beth Greene (Emily Kinney). Several flashbacks in the episode explore the different stages in Carol's life, such as her rescue mission to save the group and several tragedies she is attempting to rebound from, including the deaths of her surrogate daughters, Lizzie Samuels and her sister, Mika, as well as the lasting effect of her banishment. The title of the episode refers to Carol's explaining to Daryl about the events in her life and how she has changed, saying that "everything now just... consumes you".

Such themes as domestic abuse, death, change, and hope are prevalent throughout "Consumed". The episode prominently conveys the background abuse that both characters share, which past episodes indicated was the basis of their intimate bonding. It also sheds light on their transformations in the apocalypse and how they adapted as a result. Through this, fire is also prevalent within the episode and used precisely 10 times in various ways of showing Carol, in particular, changing as a result of various events. The episode provides an explanation to several cliffhangers in preceding episodes with the heavily utilized nonlinear narrative. This includes the revelation of how Carol ended up in Grady Memorial Hospital from the cliffhanger in "Slabtown", and the mysterious person in the woods with Daryl at the end of "Four Walls and a Roof" is revealed to be Noah.

"Consumed" has garnered critical praise from television commentators, who lauded the exploration of the characters' compelling histories and subtext, the return to cityscape in Atlanta, a prominent location used in the first season, and the performances by Melissa McBride and Norman Reedus. Others noted the slow pacing as a highlight, allowing a more contemplative narrative and better character focus.

Plot
A flashback shows Carol and her life after she was exiled by Rick. One morning at her shelter, she notices smoke rising in the distance and goes to investigate, only to find the prison in flames in the aftermath of The Governor's attack.

After the feast at the church, Carol and Daryl have been following the car with the white cross. Carol suggests running the car off the road as they are low on gas, but Daryl vetoes the plan, hoping the car will lead them to its occupants' base. They track the car deep into the ruins of Atlanta and learn that it is occupied by policemen. However, their car runs out of gas, and the engine noise attracts walkers. Carol and Daryl abandon the car and spend the night in an abused women's shelter.

The next morning, Carol and Daryl look for a suitable building from which to scout the area. They find a tall office building connected to a parking garage via a sky bridge and decide to enter from there. As they move through the garage, they are unaware that someone is following them. Upon entering the bridge, the two come across the remains of a survivor camp, with numerous walkers trapped in sleeping bags and tents. After killing the walkers in the sleeping bags, they enter an office, and Daryl spots a van with white crosses hanging over the edge of an overpass. The pair decides to investigate but is ambushed by Noah when they attempt to leave. With no choice, Carol and Daryl let him take their assault rifle and crossbow. Noah apologizes and cuts open the tents to release the trapped walkers, in order to distract the pair as he escapes. They kill the walkers and Carol aims her revolver at the fleeing Noah, but Daryl stops her.

The pair reach the van but attract a large group of walkers. They search the van for clues, find a stretcher from Grady Memorial Hospital, and deduce that Beth has been taken there. Now trapped by walkers, they go to the front of the van and use their weight to push it over the edge of the overpass and onto the ground below. Seatbelts and airbags allow them to survive the fall, though Carol suffers a shoulder injury.

The pair decides to survey the hospital from a prominent building overlooking the area, and find a walker immobilized by one of Daryl's crossbow bolts, meaning Noah is nearby. They head deeper into the building and hear Noah using the rifle. They find him attempting to move a large bookcase. Daryl attacks him from behind, taking back the weapons and leaving him trapped. A walker gets into the room and Daryl pretends to want to leave Noah to be eaten in order for Carol to make the decision to save Noah, and recognize that there are people worth saving. Noah tells them he needed their weapons to attack the hospital and rescue Beth. Realizing Noah knows where Beth is, Carol and Daryl agree to help him, but Noah warns them the police likely heard the gunfire and will be coming to investigate soon. As they attempt to escape, Noah falls behind, and Daryl stops to help him. Carol moves ahead and is struck by a police car. Noah stops Daryl from interfering, saying the hospital has the resources to treat Carol's injuries, and they helplessly watch as she is taken away. Noah tells him the hospital will be difficult to infiltrate. Together, they commandeer a truck and escape Atlanta to enlist the help of Rick and the rest of the group.

Reception

Upon airing, the episode was watched by 14.07 million American viewers with an 18-49 rating of 7.3, an increase in viewership from the previous week which had 13.53 million viewers and an 18-49 rating of 6.9.

In the United Kingdom, the episode was viewed by 1.136 million viewers, making it the highest-rated broadcast that week. It also received 0.070 million timeshift viewers. In Australia, it received 0.090 million viewers, making it the highest-rated cable broadcast that day.

The episode received positive reviews by television critics.

Zack Handlen of The A.V. Club gave the episode an A− grade. He praised Melissa McBride's portrayal of Carol Peletier, saying, "McBride is especially great; while her character’s evolution came in fits and starts, the actress manages to pull all of that together into a consistent, and endlessly fascinating, persona." He also praised the scene of the burning bodies in the episode, saying: "This is a large part of why The Walking Dead has gotten so good this season: The writers have found a way to exploit subtext and history in compelling, haunting ways. The constant threat of death keeps moments like Carol and Daryl’s encounter with the mom and daughter zombie pair (in another beautiful touch, Daryl takes care of the pair while Carol is sleeping; Carol and Daryl do a fair bit of talking through this episode, but the sight of him burning those bodies wrapped in blankets says more about their friendship than any words) from becoming completely stress free, but the real crisis is about trying to move on through an environment that seems to require you to be unthinkingly ruthless. Everyone has been thrown time and again into situations where the only way forward is to sacrifice some small part of your humanity—and yet those parts never really go away. And every walker is a reminder of what happens when you have no humanity left."

Matt Fowler of IGN rated it an 8.8 out of 10 and said, "For a terse Carol/Daryl adventure, "Consumed" triumphed in both landscape and tone, though it was hindered a bit by us knowing that nothing all that big was going to happen. It was, essentially, the final piece of the puzzle to fall into place after episodes three and four. It was mostly quiet, but rewarding nonetheless."

Rebecca Hawkes of The Daily Telegraph gave the episode 5 stars, writing that "while Consumed wasn’t a “big” episode in any sense, it was possibly one of this season’s most impressive: a reflective, rather melancholy two-hander that showed its actors at their best." In particular, she praised the performance of Melissa McBride, who she said was "in a league of her own, capable of quietly dominating every scene she’s in."

References

External links

"Consumed" at AMC

2014 American television episodes
The Walking Dead (season 5) episodes